New Paltz Downtown Historic District is a national historic district located at New Paltz in Ulster County, New York.  The district includes 147 contributing buildings, one contributing site, and eight contributing structures. It encompasses most of the portion of the village that was developed in the 19th century as it became the commercial center for a growing agricultural town.  Located within the district is the separately-listed Elting Memorial Library.

It was listed on the National Register of Historic Places in 2009.

References

National Register of Historic Places in Ulster County, New York
Historic districts on the National Register of Historic Places in New York (state)
Historic districts in Ulster County, New York
New Paltz, New York